Sterling Township is one of nine townships in Crawford County, Indiana. As of the 2010 census, its population was 1,635 and it contained 860 housing units.

Geography
Bluegill Pond and Grant Lake are in this township.

Cities and towns
 English

Unincorporated towns
 Temple
(This list is based on USGS data and may include former settlements.)

Adjacent townships
 Southeast Township, Orange County (northeast)
 Liberty Township (east)
 Whiskey Run Township (east)
 Jennings Township (southeast)
 Ohio Township (south)
 Union Township (southwest)
 Patoka Township (west)
 Greenfield Township, Orange County (northwest)

Major highways
  Indiana State Road 37
  Indiana State Road 64

Cemeteries
The township contains nine cemeteries: Cunningham, Denbo, Grant, Hamilton, Land, Purkhiser, Seton, Sloan and Stewart.

References
 United States Census Bureau cartographic boundary files
 U.S. Board on Geographic Names

External links
 Indiana Township Association
 United Township Association of Indiana

Townships in Crawford County, Indiana
Townships in Indiana